The IATP Food and Society Fellows Program provides two-year, part-time fellowships to professionals working to address health, social justice, economic viability, environmental, and other issues in food and farming systems. The program started in 2001 as a collaboration between the Jefferson Institute and the Institute for Agriculture and Trade Policy (IATP), with the guidance and support of the W.K. Kellogg Foundation. The program is currently administered by IATP  and funded by the W.K. Kellogg Foundation and the Woodcock Foundation. Generally, 8-12 fellows are selected each year; 72 fellows have been selected through 2009.

Objectives
The goals of the Food & Society Policy Fellows Program are to:

Food and Society Fellows
Food and Society Fellows organized by the year of their award.

References

Political advocacy groups in the United States
Agricultural organizations based in the United States
Clubs and societies in the United States